Tales of the Unanticipated, known as TOTU, is a semiprozine that was founded under the auspices of the Minnesota Science Fiction Society (known as Mn-STF or Minn-STF), and has since become independent. Like contemporaries such as Crank!  and Century, Tales of the Unanticipated strove from its inception to showcase fiction, poetry and articles that are ostensibly speculative fiction.

History
The first issue of Tales of the Unanticipated was launched in August 1986. Over the years, notable authors who contributed fiction, articles and/or poetry have included Kate Wilhelm, Eleanor Arnason, Damon Knight, Bruce Bethke, John Sladek, Stephen Dedman, and Neil Gaiman.

Writers who had their first published short stories premiere in TOTU include Peg Kerr, Jason Sanford, Kij Johnson, Carolyn Ives Gilman, and others who had important early appearances of their work in the magazine include Lyda Morehouse. The short story "Koan" was eventually made into the short film The Gnostic starring Francesco Quinn.

TOTU has published interviews with top speculative fiction authors, such as Gaiman, Knight, Wilhelm, Sladek, Chelsea Quinn Yarbro, Larry Niven, Fritz Leiber, Kim Stanley Robinson, and George Alec Effinger and Ursula K. Le Guin. The editors pay notice to many authors of speculative fiction who are not always marketed as “genre writers,” interviewing Gore Vidal, Jonathan Carroll, and Karen Joy Fowler.

Operations
TOTU is an anomaly in the speculative fiction magazine market in that traditionally nearly all magazines have submissions, particularly the unsolicited submissions in what is known as the slush pile, screened by lower-level readers and editors first. As of 2009, all submissions to TOTU have been read and evaluated by editor-in-chief Eric Heideman before being passed on to other editors or readers for evaluation.

See also
 Science fiction magazine
 Fantasy fiction magazine
 Horror fiction magazine

References

External links
 Tales of the Unanticipated homepage

Science fiction magazines published in the United States
Magazines established in 1986
Independent magazines
Magazines published in Minnesota
Mass media in Minneapolis–Saint Paul